Macarius IV Tawil (or Taouil) was Patriarch of the Melkite Greek Catholic Church from 1813 to 1815.

Life 
Macarius Tawil was born in Damascus. He entered in the religious order of the Basilian Salvatorians of which he was Superior from 1804 to 1807 and from 1810 to 1812. He was consecrated bishop of Zahle and Forzol by patriarch Agapius II Matar in 1811.

Macarius Tawil was elected patriarch by a synod of bishops held on 10 December 1813 at the Holy Saviour monastery, and he kept the name of Macarius . His election was contested, and it was still under review by the Roman Congregation of Propaganda Fide when Macarius IV Tawil died of pestilence on 15 December 1815.

Notes 

Syrian Melkite Greek Catholics
Melkite Greek Catholic Patriarchs of Antioch
1815 deaths
People from Damascus
Eastern Catholic monks
Year of birth missing